James Bradley Allen (born May 29, 1958 in Yakima, Washington) is an American former professional baseball third baseman for the Seattle Mariners of the Major League Baseball (MLB). He attended Arizona State University.

Amateur career 
Allen was drafted by the Minnesota Twins in the first round of the 1976 MLB draft out of A.C. Davis High School in Yakima, but chose to attend Arizona State. After three years there, he was drafted again by the Seattle Mariners in the second round of the 1979 MLB draft.

Professional career

Seattle Mariners
Allen began his professional career that summer, playing for the Bellingham Mariners of the Northwest League. During an exhibition game in 1982, as a member of the Triple-A Salt Lake City Gulls, Jamie drew a walk to win the game against the major league Seattle Mariners.

Jamie was placed on the Mariners' 40-man roster on November 6, 1982 as a part of what the Mariners' General Manager Dan O'Brien rebuilding plan.

He made his MLB debut on May 1, 1983 at the Kingdome against the Baltimore Orioles. He went one-for-four in the game. In his only big league season, Allen hit .223 with four home runs, ten doubles and 21 RBIs in 86 games. He continued to play professionally until 1985, finishing his career with the Calgary Cannons of the Pacific Coast League.

References

External links

1958 births
Living people
American expatriate baseball players in Canada
Arizona State Sun Devils baseball players
Baseball players from Washington (state)
Bellingham Mariners players
Calgary Cannons players
Lynn Sailors players
Major League Baseball third basemen
Salt Lake City Gulls players
Seattle Mariners players
Spokane Indians players
Sportspeople from Yakima, Washington
Anchorage Glacier Pilots players